Imad Kotbi (born June 8, 1978) is a Moroccan radio presenter and a disk jockey. He was born in Casablanca, and is currently working for Casa FM radio station presenting a show called "Ze Kotbi Show".

Kotbi is a Guinness World Record holder after broadcasting during 50 hours non-stop between December 29 at 20h 15 and December 31, 2006 at 12h 15 GMT.

External links
 Official website

References and notes

Moroccan radio presenters
Moroccan musicians
People from Casablanca
1978 births
Living people